This is a list of list of Royal Doulton figurines in ascending order by HN number. HN is named after Harry Nixon (1886–1955), head of the Royal Doulton painting department who joined Doulton in 1900. This list includes the HN number, the title of the Royal Doulton figurine, the designer(s), the date introduced, and if discontinued, the date discontinued.

HN1 to 99

HN100 to 199

HN200 to 299

HN300 to 399

HN400 to 499

HN500 to 599

HN600 to 699

HN700 to 799

HN800 to 899

HN900 to 999

HN1000 to 1099

HN1100 to 1199

HN1200 to 1299

HN1300 to 1399

HN1400 to 1499

HN1500 to 1599

HN1600 to 1699

HN1700 to 1799

HN1800 to 1899

HN1900 to 1999

HN2000 to 2099

HN2100 to 2199

HN2200 to 2299

HN2300 to 2399

HN2400 to 2499

HN2500 to 2599

HN2600 to 2699

HN2700 to 2799

HN2800 to 2899

HN2900 to 2999

HN3000 to 3099

HN3100 to 3199

HN3200 to 3299

HN3300 to 3399

HN3400 to 3499

HN3500 to 3599

HN3600 to 3699

HN3700 to 3799

HN3800 to 3899

HN3900 to 3999

HN4000 to 4099

HN4100 to 4199

HN4200 to 4299

HN4300 to 4399

HN4400 to 4499

HN4500 to 4599

HN4600 to 4699

HN4700 to 4799

HN4800 to 4899

HN4900 to 4999

HN5000 to 5099

HN5100 to 5199

HN5200 to 5299

HN5300 to 5399

HN5400 to 5499

HN5500 to 5599

HN5600 to 5699

HN5700 to 5799

See also
 List of Bunnykins figurines
 Royal Doulton

Citations

External links
 Dating Doulton Marks

Waterford Wedgwood
Figurines
Arts-related lists